IOI Puchong Jaya LRT station is a light rapid transit station at Puchong Jaya, a township in Puchong, Selangor. It is located near IOI Mall, and its name was taken from IOI Group and Bandar Puchong Jaya, and not under the Station Naming Rights Programme run by Prasarana.

It is operated under the Sri Petaling Line network as found in the station signage. Like most other LRT stations operating in Klang Valley, this station is elevated.

History 
The plan for an extension for the existing Sri Petaling LRT Line was proposed in 2006. Construction had started since 2011. The project, worth RM955.84 million, was awarded to a joint venture (JV) consortium of George Kent (M) Bhd and its partner Lion Pacific Sdn Bhd by 2012. Although it faced some delays, the station was opened in 31 March 2016 along with 3 more stations in Puchong. It is said that the extension had showed a 25% rate of return.

Bus services

Feeder buses

Other buses

Station details

Infrastructure 
As part of a green initiative, the extension includes green practices. Energy-efficient lights and rainwater harvesting systems were installed in every station. Windows were designed to allow sunlight into the stations. Construction utilized sustainable materials and recycling practices.

Facilities 
The stations includes several stores such as a 7-Eleven grocery store, a health and beauty product shop, and an ASTRO service centre. A shuttle buggy ride to-and-fro IOI Mall Puchong is provided.

Gallery

References

External links 

IOI Puchong Jaya LRT Station - KL MRT Line Integrations

Ampang Line
Railway stations opened in 2016